Aung San Suu Kyi has received numerous honours and awards, including the 1991 Nobel Peace Prize and the Presidential Medal of Freedom, throughout her life for her peace and freedom activism in her homeland of Myanmar. However, since the start of the Rohingya genocide in 2016, many of these honours and awards have been revoked due to her perceived inaction to stop the crisis.

Currently held

Orders, decorations and medals
Foreign
  Honorary Companion of the Order of Australia (AC) - Civil Division (24 May 1996).
  Presidential Medal of Freedom (6 December 2000)
  Sultan of Brunei Golden Jubilee Medal – 6 October 2017

Other distinctions 
  Nobel Peace Prize (14 October 1991)
  Olof Palme Prize (2005)
  Congressional Gold Medal (6 May 2008)
  Chatham House Prize (2011)
  The Wallenberg Medal from the University of Michigan (2011)

Scholastic
 University Degrees

 Chancellor, visitor, governor, rector, and fellowships

Honorary degrees

Honorary degrees

Memberships and fellowships

Freedom of the City
  1994: Rome (Collected on 27 October 2013)  
  13 May 2011: Brighton and Hove

Revoked or status otherwise withdrawn

Honorary citizenship
Honorary Canadian citizenship (awarded 2007, due to concerns over the Rohingya genocide, revoked 27 September 2018 by unanimous vote of the House of Commons of the  Parliament of Canada, with the unanimous concurrence of the Senate of Canada on 2 October 2018). She is the first recipient of honorary Canadian citizenship to have the honour withdrawn.

Distinctions of societies and associations
  Sakharov Prize (1990), rescinded on 10 September 2020
  Amnesty International Ambassador of Conscience Award (2009), rescinded on 11 November 2018
  The Elie Wiesel Award from the United States Holocaust Memorial Museum (2012), rescinded on 6 March 2018.

Honorary degrees
 Queen's University Doctor of Laws (LL.D; awarded 1995, revoked 30 November 2018)
 Carleton University Doctor of Laws (LL.D; awarded 2011, revoked 19 October 2018)

Memberships and fellowships
 Hony. Member of UNISON (suspended 20 September 2017)

Freedoms of cities
  1997: Oxford (Revoked on 27 November 2017)  
  1 November 1999: Dublin (Revoked on 13 December 2017)  
  2004: Paris (Revoked on 13 December 2018)
  2005: Edinburgh (Revoked on 23 August 2018) 
  2005: Galway (Galway City Council revoked Freedom on 11 February 2019) 
  2005: Sheffield (Revoked in November 2017) 
  2008: Dundee (Revoked in September 2018) 
  2009: Glasgow (Revoked on 3 November 2017)
  18 June 2011: Newcastle (Revoked in August 2018) 
  May 2017: London (The City of London Corporation's Court of Common Council voted to Revoke on 5 March 2020)

References

Aung San Suu Kyi